The Canadian Journal of Philosophy is a peer-reviewed academic journal of philosophy that was established in 1971 by John King-Farlow, Kai Nielsen, T.M. Penelhum, and W. W. Rozeboom. It is incorporated in Alberta, Canada as a non-profit corporation. As of January 2020 it is published by Cambridge University Press. Besides the regular issues, a supplementary volume is produced once per year consisting of invited papers on a particular philosophical topic.

External links
 

Philosophy journals
Publications established in 1971
University of Calgary
English-language journals
1971 establishments in Canada
Philosophy Documentation Center academic journals
Cambridge University Press academic journals
8 times per year journals